William Leroy "Mack" McCarthy (born July 3, 1952) is the former head college basketball coach for East Carolina University. On March 6, 2010, athletic director Terry Holland announced that McCarthy would complete the season as head coach and then move to a fundraising role with East Carolina University. He served as head coach at the University of Tennessee at Chattanooga from 1985 to 1997, leading the Mocs to the 1997 Sweet Sixteen in the NCAA tournament. Over his 12-year tenure, he took the Mocs to seven postseason appearances (five to the NCAA Tournament), won/shared eight Southern Conference regular season titles and won the SoCon Tournament title five times. His overall record at UTC was 243–122.

McCarthy was also the head coach of the VCU Rams from 1998 to 2002, with a 4-year record of 66–55. Prior to becoming a head coach, he spent two years as an assistant at his alma mater, Virginia Tech, and nine seasons assisting head coach Sonny Smith (two at East Tennessee State and seven at Auburn).

In 19 seasons as a college basketball head coach, McCarthy has a 59.4% winning percentage with a record of 343–234.

In 2014, McCarthy became a college basketball analyst for the American Sports Network, calling CAA and C-USA games, additionally, he also has called games on ESPN3 and the ACC Network Extra for Virginia Tech with Andrew Allegretta, Bailey Angle, Bryant Johnson, and Evan Hughes.

Head coaching record

References

External links
 East Carolina profile

1952 births
Living people
American men's basketball coaches
Auburn Tigers men's basketball coaches
Basketball coaches from Virginia
Chattanooga Mocs men's basketball coaches
College men's basketball head coaches in the United States
East Carolina Pirates men's basketball coaches
East Tennessee State Buccaneers men's basketball coaches
People from Woodstock, Virginia
VCU Rams men's basketball coaches
Virginia Tech Hokies men's basketball coaches
Virginia Tech alumni